Karazirek (Qarayerek) is a rural locality (a village) in Tyuryushevsky Selsoviet, Buzdyaksky District, Bashkortostan, Russia. The population was 123 as of 2010. There is 1 street.

Geography 
Karazirek is located 45 km north of Buzdyak (the district's administrative centre) by road. Makarovka is the nearest rural locality.

References 

Rural localities in Buzdyaksky District